was a steam gunboat, serving in the early Imperial Japanese Navy. She was named after the island of Ōshima off Shizuoka prefecture.

Background and design
She is noteworthy in that she was the first ship to be built in Japan with a vertical triple-expansion steam engine.

She was equipped with four  QF guns, one each on the bow, stern, and in sponsons on either side of the hull. Secondary armament included five  Hotchkiss guns.
Ōshima was laid down at the Onohama Shipyards in Kobe under direction of the Kure Naval Arsenal on 29 August 1889 and launched on 14 October 1891. She was completed on 31 March 1892.

Operational history
Ōshima saw combat service in the First Sino-Japanese War, during which time an additional three  guns and an additional three  guns were fitted, patrolling between Korea, Dairen and Weihaiwei in a reserve capacity in the IJN 2nd Fleet.

On 21 March 1898, Ōshima was re-designated as a second-class gunboat, and was used for coastal survey and patrol duties. In September 1898, the Chinese reformer and journalist Liang Qichao fled to exile in Japan aboard Ōshima, which took him to Miyajima with the assistance of the Japanese government.

During the Russo-Japanese War, Ōshima assisted in the Siege of Port Arthur. On 18 May 1904, under the command of Commander Hirose Katsuhiko (the elder brother of the famous Takeo Hirose) she collided in a heavy fog with the gunboat  and sank in the early hours of the following morning in Liaotung Bay off of Port Arthur at position .

Ōshima was removed from the navy list on 15 June 1905.

Notes

References
 Corbett, Sir Julian. Maritime Operations In The Russo-Japanese War 1904-1905. (1994) Originally classified, and in two volumes, 
Chesneau, Roger and Eugene M. Kolesnik (editors), All The World's Fighting Ships 1860-1905, Conway Maritime Press, 1979 reprinted 2002,

External links

Gunboats of the Imperial Japanese Navy
Ships built in Japan
1891 ships
First Sino-Japanese War naval ships of Japan
Russo-Japanese War naval ships of Japan
Shipwrecks in the Yellow Sea
Maritime incidents in 1904
Shipwrecks of the Russo-Japanese War
Ships sunk in collisions

ja:大島 (砲艦)